The "Crucible curse" (also known as "The curse of the Crucible" or sometimes the "Crucible jinx") is a quip in professional snooker referring to the fact that every first-time world champion has failed to retain the title the following year. The curse dates back to 1977, when the tournament moved to its current home, the Crucible Theatre in Sheffield.

Several world champions did successfully defend their first title prior to the championship's move to the Crucible Theatre; the last player to do so was John Pulman in 1964. Since 1977, eighteen world champions have experienced the curse, the most recent being the 2019 World Champion Judd Trump who was beaten in the quarter-finals of the 2020 event.

The curse
The first-time world champions listed below all experienced the "Crucible curse", as they did not successfully defend their title at the following year's World Championship.

Of the eighteen players to have won their first world title at the Crucible Theatre, six lost in their first match as defending champion: Terry Griffiths in 1980, Steve Davis in 1982, Dennis Taylor in 1986, Graeme Dott in 2007, Neil Robertson in 2011, and Stuart Bingham in 2016. Most recently, Judd Trump fell to the curse at the quarter-final stage. Only two of the eighteen were able to reach the final as defending champions: Joe Johnson in 1987 and Ken Doherty in 1998.

Four players have won consecutive world titles at the Crucible (having already won the championship previously): Steve Davis (1983–1984 and 1987–1989), Stephen Hendry (1992–1996), Ronnie O'Sullivan (2012–2013), and Mark Selby (2016–2017). All of these players had already experienced the "Crucible curse" after winning their first world title.

Pre-Crucible
Out of all the first-time world snooker champions, only three retained their title at the next World Championship: Joe Davis in 1928, his brother Fred Davis in 1949, and John Pulman at his first challenge match in 1964. No player in the modern game (post-1969) has successfully defended a first world title, even before the tournament was staged at the Crucible Theatre.

John Spencer, Ray Reardon and Alex Higgins won the World Championship for the first time before the event was moved to the Crucible in 1977, and failed to retain the title the following year (although this could not be attributed to the "Crucible curse"). All three players subsequently won the championship at the Crucible for the first time, but then fell to the "curse" when they failed to successfully defend the title the following year.

Notes

References

World Snooker Championships
Sports-related curses
Snooker terminology
Lists of snooker players